Maciej Kozlowski (8 September 1957 – 11 May 2010) was a Polish actor, mostly known for his roles in Kingsajz, Psy, Kiler, With Fire and Sword and Schindler's List and the TV series M jak miłość.

Kozlowski was born in Kargowa, and was a graduate of the National Film School in Łódź.  He also played as a defender in the Polish Artists Football Team. He died in Warsaw, aged 52; the cause of death was cirrhosis of the liver caused by hepatitis C virus. His funeral was attended by: Daniel Olbrychski, Bogusław Linda, Zbigniew Zamachowski, Piotr Zelt, Michał Milowicz, Małgorzata Kożuchowska, Grażyna Wolszczak, Tomasz Karolak, Wiktor Zborowski, Marian Opania, Olaf Lubaszenko, Jan Englert, Robert Więckiewicz, Michał Żebrowski, Artur Żmijewski.

Filmography

Films

1984: 
1984: Nie było słońca tej wiosny - Piotr Wolosz
1985: Mgła - 'Kim'
1985: Osobisty pamiętnik grzesznika przez niego samego spisany - Stranger
1988: Kingsajz - Was
1989: Szklany dom - urzędnik
1990: Piggate - Alan Lecog
1990: Mów mi Rockefeller - Matros, wspólnik Jagody
1990: Ucieczka z kina "Wolność" - American Actor
1990: Po upadku - Uczestnik narady
1991: Kroll - Captain
1992: Szwadron - Kozlow
1992: Psy - Baranski
1993: Superwizja - Agent
1993: Balanga - Lt. Bakala
1993: Pora na czarownice
1993: Schindler's List - SS Guard Zablocie
1993: Pożegnanie z Marią - Cart Driver
1993:  (TV Movie) - Dabek
1994: Miasto prywatne - Ali
1994: Piękna warszawianka - jako portier
1995: Jönssonligans största kupp - Ritzie
1995: Nic śmiesznego - Maciej
1995: Dzieje mistrza Twardowskiego
1996: Deszczowy żołnierz - Officer
1996: Wirus
1996: Poznań 56 - UB Man
1996: Drzewa
1997: Kiler - Prosecutor
1998: Drugi brzeg (TV Movie) - Stimming
1999: With Fire and Sword - Maksym Kryvonis
1999: Ajlawju - Maniek
1999: Na koniec świata - Notary
2000: Ostatnia misja - Cortez
2000: Liceum czarnej magii (TV Movie) - Dyrektor Kazimierz Pluto
2000: To ja, złodziej - Maks
2001: Blok.pl - Balagan
2001: Wiedźmin - Gwido / Falwick
2002: E=MC2 - Alosza
2002: Jak to się robi z dziewczynami - Dlugi
2003: Stara baśń - Smerda
2005: Masz na imię Justine - Abattoir Examiner
2005: Oda do radości - Piotr (segment "Warsaw")
2007: Jasne blekitne okna - Zbigniew
2007: Świadek koronny - Szybki
2008: Idealny facet dla mojej dziewczyny - Antoni Chrumski
2008: Kochaj i tańcz - Taxi Driver
2009: Generał Nil - Tadeusz Grzmielewski
2009: Janosik. Prawdziwa historia - First Judge
2010: Sufferosa - Rene Levert (final film role)

TV Series

1980: Królowa Bona
1985: Przyłbice i kaptury - Benko
1992: Pogranicze w ogniu - Von Seebohm / Major von Seebohm
1996: Matki, żony i kochanki - Waldemar
1997-2000: Dom - Aleksander
1997: Sposób na Alcybiadesa - Psychologist Jacek Stanislaw Karwid
1998: Matki, żony i kochanki II - Waldemar
1998: 13 posterunek - Policeman
1998-1999: Ekstradycja III - Trainer / BOR Officer
1999: Ogniem i mieczem - Krzywonos
2000: 13 posterunek 2
2000: Klasa na obcasach
2001-2002: Na dobre i na złe - Marcin
2001: Marszałek Piłsudski - gen. Gustaw Dreszer-Orlicz (2001)
2001: Wiedźmin - Falwick / Gwido
2002: Przedwiośnie
2002: Samo Życie
2002-2010: M jak miłość - Waldemar Jaroszy
2004: Czwarta władza
2004: Oficer - Michal Matejewski
2006: Pogoda na piątek - Krzysztof
2007: Ekipa - Arkadiusz Stoch
2007: Odwróceni - Roman Kraus 'Szybki'
2008-2009: 39 i pół - Zdrada
2008: Trzeci oficer - Michal Matejewski
2009: Ojciec Mateusz - Rosa
2009: Plebania
2010: Szpilki na Giewoncie - Jedrek Skorupa

References

External links

1957 births
2010 deaths
Deaths from cancer in Poland
Polish male actors
People from Zielona Góra County